Changhong Subdistrict is a subdistrict located within Nankai District, Tianjin, China. It borders Shaogongzhuang and Jieyuan Subdistricts to the north, Lingdangge and Guangkai Subdistricts to the east, Wanxing and Jialing Street Subdistricts to the south, and Xiangyang Road Subdistrict to the west. Its total population was 73,346 as of 2010.

The name Changhong is taken from Changhong Park that is located on the southeastern section of the subdistrict.

Geography 
Changhong subdistrict is on the southern bank of Nanyun River and western bank of Jin River.

History

Administrative divisions 
So far in 2021, Changhong Subdistrict composes of 13 residential communities, all of which are listed below:

Gallery

References 

Township-level divisions of Tianjin
Nankai District, Tianjin